Nazar Yahya is an Iraqi artist living in Houston, Texas.  Nazar currently works on installations and inkjet on cotton paper projects.

Early life and education
Nazar Yahya, born in Baghdad, Iraq, began exhibiting in Baghdad in the late 1970s. He earned his B.F.A. at the Academy of Fine Arts, Baghdad in 1986. From 1986 to 1991, Nazar worked as a map painter in the Army’s rear lines. In 2003, during the outbreak of war in Iraq, he took his family to Amman, Jordan. Currently he lives in Houston, Texas.

Career
Nazar Yahya began his work with metal creating etchings and later continued to works on canvas, as well as paper and photography. In his early career, Nazar worked on experiments with dafatir (singular: daftar); a new expression of artist's book, or art object, possessing a distinct postmodern interpretation of the Islamic manuscript production. During the 1990s and throughout the invasion, Dafatir as a vehicle of expression intensified in Iraq.

Style

Themes

Reception

Work

Major exhibitions
Nazar’s work has been exhibited in the Middle East: Beirut, Bahrain, Amman, Dubai, Qatar; Europe: London, Norway; Bangladesh; and the United States: Texas.

Select list of notable works
 Card of Illumination

Public collections

Awards and nominations

See also
 Iraqi art
 List of Iraqi artists

References

1963 births
20th-century Iraqi painters
21st-century Iraqi painters
Iraqi contemporary artists
Iraqi photographers
Living people